Neosho Rapids is a city in Lyon County, Kansas, United States.  As of the 2020 census, the population of the city was 229.

History
Neosho Rapids was previously called Italia then Florence, and was laid out in 1855. It was named Neosho Rapids in 1857 from the whitewater on the Neosho River.

LIFE magazine did a 5-page feature article in the December 24, 1945, issue of servicemen coming home to the town for their first Christmas after WWII.

Geography
Neosho Rapids is located at  (38.368716, -95.991901).

Climate
The climate in this area is characterized by hot, humid summers and generally mild to cool winters.  According to the Köppen Climate Classification system, Neosho Rapids has a humid subtropical climate, abbreviated "Cfa" on climate maps.

Demographics

Neosho Rapids is part of the Emporia Micropolitan Statistical Area.

2010 census
As of the census of 2010, there were 265 people, 105 households, and 67 families residing in the city. The racial makeup of the city was 98.1% White and 1.9% from two or more races. Hispanic or Latino of any race were 3.4% of the population.

There were 105 households, of which 33.3% had children under the age of 18 living with them, 50.5% were married couples living together, 7.6% had a female householder with no husband present, 5.7% had a male householder with no wife present, and 36.2% were non-families. 29.5% of all households were made up of individuals, and 16.2% had someone living alone who was 65 years of age or older. The average household size was 2.48 and the average family size was 3.03.

The median age in the city was 38.5 years. 25.3% of residents were under the age of 18; 7.5% were between the ages of 18 and 24; 24.1% were from 25 to 44; 27.1% were from 45 to 64; and 15.8% were 65 years of age or older. The gender makeup of the city was 49.1% male and 50.9% female.

2000 census
As of the census of 2000, there were 274 people, 104 households, and 79 families residing in the city. The racial makeup of the city was 96.35% White, 1.82% African American, 0.36% from other races, and 1.46% from two or more races. Hispanic or Latino of any race were 2.19% of the population.

There were 104 households, out of which 35.6% had children under the age of 18 living with them, 64.4% were married couples living together, 4.8% had a female householder with no husband present, and 24.0% were non-families. 20.2% of all households were made up of individuals, and 7.7% had someone living alone who was 65 years of age or older. The average household size was 2.53 and the average family size was 2.90.

In the city, the population was spread out, with 26.3% under the age of 18, 4.4% from 18 to 24, 31.8% from 25 to 44, 23.4% from 45 to 64, and 14.2% who were 65 years of age or older. The median age was 39 years. For every 100 females, there were 112.4 males. For every 100 females age 18 and over, there were 100.0 males.

The median income for a household in the city was $29,423, and the median income for a family was $35,250. Males had a median income of $28,750 versus $20,000 for females. The per capita income for the city was $13,239. About 6.2% of families and 10.8% of the population were below the poverty line, including 2.8% of those under the age of eighteen and 36.9% of those 65 or over.

Education
The community is served by Southern Lyon County USD 252 public school district.

See also
 Great Flood of 1951

References

Further reading

External links
 Neosho Rapids - Directory of Public Officials
 Neosho Rapids city map, KDOT

Cities in Kansas
Cities in Lyon County, Kansas
Emporia, Kansas micropolitan area
Populated places established in 1855
1855 establishments in Kansas Territory